Stefanaconi is a comune (municipality) in the Province of Vibo Valentia in the Italian region Calabria, located about  southwest of Catanzaro and about  east of Vibo Valentia.

The municipality of Stefanaconi contains the frazione (subdivision) Morsillara.

Stefanaconi borders the following municipalities: Francica, Gerocarne, Pizzoni, Sant'Onofrio, Soriano Calabro, Vazzano, Vibo Valentia.

Demographic evolution

Surnames
11 most common names in Stefanaconi.
 Franzè
 Lopreiato
 Matina
 Fortuna
 Solano
 Arcella
 Cugliari
 De Fina
 Maluccio
 Meddis
 Piperno

References

External links
 www.comuneweb.it/StefanaconiHome/

Cities and towns in Calabria